Rajmahal Assembly constituency   is one of the 81 Vidhan Sabha (Legislative Assembly) constituencies of Jharkhand state in eastern India. This constituency covers Rajmahal and Sahebganj Police Stations in Rajmahal sub-division of the district.

Overview
Rajmahal (constituency number 1) is one of the three Jharkhand Vidhan Sabha constituencies in Sahebganj district. It is one of the Assembly segments of the Rajmahal Lok Sabha constituency along with 5 other segments, namely, Borio and Barhait in this district and Litipara, Pakur and Maheshpur in Pakur district

Members of Legislative Assembly

See also
Rajmahal (community development block)
Sahibganj (community development block)
Rajmahal
Sahibganj
List of states of India by type of legislature
Jharkhand Vidhan Sabha

References

Assembly constituencies of Jharkhand
Sahibganj district